The Hartlepool War Memorial may refer to the World War I and II war memorials in Hartlepool, County Durham, England:
 Redheugh Gardens War Memorial, on the headlands near the lighthouse
 West Hartlepool War Memorial, located in Victory Square

Buildings and structures in Hartlepool